Ten pence may refer to:

 Ten pence (British coin), a coin of the United Kingdom
 Ten pence (Irish coin), a former coin of the Republic of Ireland

See also

 Two pence
 Threepence (disambiguation)
 Five pence (disambiguation)
 Sixpence (disambiguation)
 Twenty pence (disambiguation)
 Twenty-five pence
 Fifty pence (disambiguation)